Federal elections were held in West Germany on 3 October 1976 to elect the members of the 8th Bundestag. Although the CDU/CSU alliance became the largest faction in parliament, Helmut Schmidt of the Social Democratic Party remained Chancellor.

Campaign
The coalition of the SPD and the FDP wanted to be re-elected, with the SPD, since 1974 led by Helmut Schmidt, the party's candidate for Chancellor. The CDU and the CSU tried to achieve an absolute majority of the votes to make CDU chairman Helmut Kohl Chancellor.

Results

Results by state

Constituency seats

List seats

Aftermath
The coalition between the SPD and the FDP remained in government, with Helmut Schmidt as Chancellor. Between the "sister parties" of CDU and Bavarian CSU there emerged a critical conflict, as the CSU leader Franz Josef Strauß wanted to break both the united Bundestag group of the parties and the agreement not to compete against each other in any Land. Later, this attack was withdrawn, while Strauß became candidate for chancellor for the 1980 elections.

Notes

References

External links
 The Federal Returning Officer
 Psephos

Federal elections in Germany
1976 elections in Germany
Helmut Schmidt
1976 in West Germany
October 1976 events in Europe